KGTS (91.3 FM) is a radio station in College Place, Washington, broadcasting to the Walla Walla Valley, including Walla Walla, Washington, and the Tri-Cities. The station oversees the programming for the Positive Life Radio broadcasting network. It is owned by Walla Walla University.

History
KGTS was founded in 1963 on the campus of Walla Walla University, then Walla Walla College. At that time, it was the first FM station in the Walla Walla Valley. The station manager Loren Dickinson operated the radio station with the help of volunteers, featuring news, classical music, and religious programming.

References

External links

Walla Walla County, Washington
Walla Walla University
Seventh-day Adventist media
GTS